Erik Thorvaldsson, known as Erik the Red, was a Norse explorer, described in medieval and Icelandic saga sources as having founded the first European settlement in Greenland. He most likely earned the epithet "the Red" due to the color of his hair and beard. According to Icelandic sagas, he was born in the Jæren district of Rogaland, Norway, as the son of Thorvald Asvaldsson. One of Erik's sons was the well-known Icelandic explorer Leif Erikson.

Personal life

Early life
Erik Thorvaldsson was born in Rogaland, Norway in 950 CE. He was the son of Thorvald Asvaldson (also spelled Osvaldson). As a method of conflict resolution that subsequently became something of a family custom, Erik the Red's father, Thorvald Asvaldsson, was banished from Norway for manslaughter. He sailed west from Norway with his family, including 10-year-old Erik, and settled in Hornstrandir in northwestern Iceland, where he eventually died before 1000 CE.

Marriage and family
Erik married Þjódhild Jorundsdottir and moved to Haukadalr (Hawksdale) where he built a farm called Eiríksstaðir. Þjódhild was the daughter of Jorundur Ulfsson and Þorbjorg Gilsdottir. Medieval Icelandic tradition relates that Erik the Red and his wife Þjódhild had four children: a daughter, Freydís, and three sons, the explorer Leif Erikson, Thorvald and Thorstein. Unlike his son Leif and Leif's wife, who became Christians, Erik remained a follower of Norse paganism. While Erik's wife took heartily to Christianity, even commissioning Greenland's first church, Erik greatly disliked it and stuck to his Norse gods—which, the sagas relate, led Þjódhild to withhold intercourse from her husband.

Exile
Following in his father's footsteps, Erik also found himself exiled for a time. The initial confrontation occurred when his thralls (slaves) started a landslide on the neighboring farm belonging to Valthjof. In turn, Valthjof's friend, Eyjolf the Foul, killed the thralls. So, in retaliation, Erik killed Eyjolf and Holmgang-Hrafn. Because Eyjolf's kinsmen demanded his banishment from Haukadal, the Icelanders later sentenced Erik to exile for three years for killing Eyjolf the Foul around the year 982.

Erik then moved to Brokey island and Öxney (Eyxney) island in Iceland. He asked Thorgest to keep his setstokkr—inherited ornamented beams of significant mystical value, which his father had brought from Norway. When he had finished his new house, he went back to get them, but they "could not be obtained". Erik then went to Breidabolstad and took them. These are likely to have been Thorgest's setstokkr, although the sagas are unclear at this point. Thorgest gave chase, and in the ensuing fight Erik slew both Thorgest's sons and "a few other men".  After this, each of them retained a considerable body of men with him at his home. Styr gave Erik his support, as did also Eyiolf of Sviney, Thorbjiorn, Vifil's son, and the sons of Thorbrand of Alptafirth; while Thorgest was backed by the sons of Thord the Yeller, and Thorgeir of Hitardal, Aslak of Langadal and his son Illugi.The dispute was resolved at an assembly, the Thing, which outlawed Erik for three years.

Death
Erik's son Leif Erikson became the first Viking to explore the land of Vinland–part of North America, probably near modern-day Newfoundland–and invited his father on the voyage. However, according to legend, Erik fell off his horse on the way to the ship and took this as a bad sign, leaving his son to continue without him. Erik died in an epidemic that killed many of the colonists in the winter after his son's departure.

Discoveries 

Even though popular history credits Erik as the first European person to discover Greenland, the Icelandic sagas suggest that earlier Norsemen discovered and tried to settle it before him. Tradition credits Gunnbjörn Ulfsson (also known as Gunnbjörn Ulf-Krakuson) with the first sighting of the land-mass. Nearly a century before Erik, strong winds had driven Gunnbjörn towards the land he called Gunnbjörn's skerries. But the accidental nature of Gunnbjörn's discovery has led to his neglect in the history of Greenland. After Gunnbjörn, Snæbjörn galti had also visited Greenland. According to records from the time, Galti headed the first Norse attempt to colonize Greenland, which ended in disaster. However, Erik the Red was the first permanent European settler.

Greenland
During his exile, around 982, Erik sailed to a somewhat mysterious and little-known land that Snæbjörn galti Hólmsteinsson had unsuccessfully attempted to settle four years before.  He rounded the southern tip of the island, later known as Cape Farewell, and sailed up the western coast. Eventually, he reached a part of the coast that, for the most part, seemed ice-free and consequently had conditions—similar to those of Iceland—that promised growth and future prosperity. According to the Saga of Erik the Red, he spent his three years of exile exploring this land. The first winter he spent on the island of Eiriksey, the second winter he passed in Eiriksholmar (close to Hvarfsgnipa). In the final summer he explored as far north as Snaefell and into Hrafnsfjord.

When Erik returned to Iceland after his exile had expired, he is said to have brought with him stories of "Greenland". Erik deliberately gave the land a more appealing name than "Iceland" in order to lure potential settlers. He explained, "people would be attracted to go there if it had a favorable name". He knew that the success of any settlement in Greenland would need the support of as many people as possible. His salesmanship proved successful, as many people—especially "those Vikings living on poor land in Iceland" and those that had suffered a "recent famine"—became convinced that Greenland held great opportunity.

After spending the winter in Iceland, Erik returned to Greenland in 985 with a large number of colonists. Out of 25 ships that left for Greenland eleven were lost at sea; only 14 arrived. The Icelanders established two colonies on the southwest coast: the Eastern Settlement or Eystribyggð, in what is now Qaqortoq, and the Western Settlement, close to present-day Nuuk. Eventually, a Middle Settlement grew, but many people suggest it formed part of the Western Settlement. The Eastern and Western Settlements, both established on the southwest coast, proved the only two areas suitable for farming. During the summers, when the weather was more favorable to travel, each settlement would send an army of men to hunt in Disko Bay above the Arctic Circle for food and other valuable commodities such as seals (used for rope), ivory from walrus tusks, and beached whales.

Eastern Settlement 

In the Eastern Settlement, Erik built the estate of Brattahlíð, near present-day Narsarsuaq. He held the title of paramount chieftain of Greenland and became both greatly respected and wealthy.

The settlement flourished, growing to 5,000 inhabitants spread over a considerable area along Eriksfjord and neighboring fjords. Groups of immigrants escaping overcrowding in Iceland joined the original party. However, one group of immigrants which arrived in 1002 brought with it an epidemic that ravaged the colony, killing many of its leading citizens, including Erik himself. Nevertheless, the colony rebounded and survived until the Little Ice Age made the land marginal for European life-styles in the 15th century–shortly before Christopher Columbus's first voyage to the Americas in 1492. Pirate raids, conflict with Inuit moving into the Norse territories, and the colony's abandonment by Norway became other factors in its decline.

Comparisons to Greenland saga 

There are numerous parallels between the Saga of Erik the Red and the Greenland saga, including recurring characters and recountings of the same expeditions, though with a few notable differences. The saga of Erik the Red portrays a number of the expeditions in the Greenland saga as just one expedition led by Thorfinn Karlsefni, although Erik's son Thorvald, his daughter Freydís and Karlsefni's wife Gudrid play key roles in the retelling. Another notable difference is the location of their settlements. According to the Grœnlendinga saga, Karlsefni and the others settled in a place that is referred to only as Vinland, while in Erik the Red's saga they formed two base settlements: Straumfjǫrðr where they spent the winter and the following spring, and Hop where they later settled but ran into problems with the natives they called Skrælings, as depicted in the Greenland saga. The two accounts are largely similar otherwise, both with heavy emphasis on the exploits of Thorfinn Karlsefni and his wife Gudrid.

Notes

References

External links

 
 "The Fate of Greenland's Vikings"
 

950s births
1000s deaths
10th-century explorers
10th-century Icelandic people
11th-century Icelandic people
Norwegian exiles
Germanic pagans
Icelandic explorers
Icelandic people of Norwegian descent
Norse settlements in Greenland
Norwegian emigrants to Greenland
Norwegian explorers
Norwegian sailors
Scandinavian explorers of North America
Viking warriors
10th-century Vikings